Dino Murić (born February 14, 1990) is a Slovenian professional basketball player for Šenčur GGD of the Slovenian League. He is a 2.00 m (6 ft 7 in) tall power forward.

In October 2010, he signed with the Slovenian club Union Olimpija.

Personal life
His younger brother Edo is also a professional basketball player.

References

External links
 Adriatic League profile
 Union Olimpija profile
 Euroleague.net profile

1990 births
Living people
ABA League players
KK Olimpija players
Slovenian men's basketball players
Slovenian people of Bosniak descent
Basketball players from Ljubljana
Power forwards (basketball)